Caracollo (hispanicized spelling), Q'araqullu or Q'ara Qullu (Aymara q'ara bald, qullu mountain, "bald mountain") is a small town in Bolivia. It is situated in the Cercado Province of the Oruro Department. In 2010 it had an estimated population of 5,429. Located at the place where the highway from La Paz splits into two roads towards Cochabamba and Oruro, the town is a frequent starting point for long marches intended to influence the Bolivian government.

References

 National Institute of Statistics in Bolivia

Populated places in Oruro Department
Populated places in the Altiplano